The 1937 Ohio State Buckeyes football team represented Ohio State University in the 1937 Big Ten Conference football season. The Buckeyes compiled a 6–2 record and outscored opponents 125–23.

Schedule

Coaching staff
 Francis Schmidt, head coach, fourth year

1938 NFL draftees

References

Ohio State
Ohio State Buckeyes football seasons
Ohio State Buckeyes football